Fawzi Dahash Awadh Al-Shammari 
فوزي دهش عوض الشمري
(born February 13, 1979) is a Kuwaiti former athlete who competed in the 200 and 400 metres.

Competition record

References

External links
 

1979 births
Living people
Kuwaiti male sprinters
Athletes (track and field) at the 2000 Summer Olympics
Athletes (track and field) at the 2004 Summer Olympics
Olympic athletes of Kuwait
Asian Games medalists in athletics (track and field)
Athletes (track and field) at the 1998 Asian Games
Athletes (track and field) at the 2002 Asian Games
Athletes (track and field) at the 2006 Asian Games
Athletes (track and field) at the 2010 Asian Games
Asian Games gold medalists for Kuwait
Asian Games bronze medalists for Kuwait
Medalists at the 2002 Asian Games
Medalists at the 2006 Asian Games
20th-century Kuwaiti people
21st-century Kuwaiti people